Deividas Sirvydis (born 10 June 2000) is a Lithuanian professional basketball player for the Wisconsin Herd of the NBA G League. Sirvydis was selected 37th overall by the Dallas Mavericks in the 2019 NBA draft and was then traded to the Detroit Pistons.

Early life and youth career
Sirvydis spent his childhood in various European countries because of his father's professional basketball career. He lived for three years in Russia, two years in Germany, one year in the Czech Republic, and one year in Cyprus. Sirvydis often practiced basketball after his father's games but did not seriously start playing the sport until he was about seven years old. 

In May 2018, Sirvydis won the 2017–18 Adidas Next Generation Tournament with the Rytas Vilnius U18 team and was named most valuable player after recording 18 points, 6 rebounds and 3 assists in the title game against Stella Azzurra Rome under-18 team.

Professional career

Rytas Vilnius (2017–2020)
Sirvydis made his Lithuanian Basketball League (LKL) debut with Rytas Vilnius on 29 May 2017, at age 16, and passed Jonas Valančiūnas as the youngest player in club history to play in the league. On 5 December, he became the youngest Lietuvos rytas player to appear in a EuroCup game, overtaking Valančiūnas again. In the 2019–20 season, Sirvydis averaged 6.6 points and 2.8 rebounds for Rytas in EuroCup play. He averaged 5.7 points and 2.5 rebounds per game in the LKL.

Hapoel Jerusalem (2020)
On 23 May 2020, Sirvydis signed a long-term contract with Hapoel Jerusalem of the Israeli Basketball Premier League. He left the team on 16 November to join the Detroit Pistons for training camp.

Detroit Pistons / Motor City Cruise (2020–2022)
In the 2019 NBA draft, Sirvydis was selected 37th overall by the Dallas Mavericks, but was immediately traded to the Detroit Pistons in exchange for Isaiah Roby and two future second-round picks. He represented the Pistons at 2019 NBA Summer League.

On 1 December 2020, Sirvydis signed a three-year contract with the Detroit Pistons. On 6 January 2021, Sirvydis made his the National Basketball Association (NBA) debut in a game against the Milwaukee Bucks. On 3 March, Sirvydis scored his first NBA point in the Pistons' 129–105 win over the Toronto Raptors. On 14 May, Sirvydis scored a career high of 16 points in a loss against the Denver Nuggets. On 31 July, Sirvydis was waived by the Pistons. On 28 September, he re-signed with the Pistons, but was waived the next day.

On 25 October 2021, Sirvydis signed with the Motor City Cruise of the NBA G League.

On 26 December 2021, the Pistons signed Sirvydis to a 10-day contract. Sirvydis was assigned to the Cruise on 5 January 2022.

After his 10-day contract with the Pistons expired, Sirvydis returned to the Cruise.

Sirvydis joined the New Orleans Pelicans for the 2022 NBA Summer League. On 18 August 2022, he signed with the Indiana Pacers. On 22 October, the Pacers waived Sirvydis before the beginning of the regular season.

Fort Wayne Mad Ants (2022–2023)
On 24 October 2022, Sirvydis joined the Fort Wayne Mad Ants training camp roster.

Wisconsin Herd (2023–present)
On February 24, 2023, Sirvydis was traded to the Wisconsin Herd in exchange for Jordan Bone.

Career statistics

Regular season

|-
| style="text-align:left;"|
| style="text-align:left;"|Detroit
| 20 || 0 || 6.7 || .350 || .357 || .500 || 1.5 || .3 || .1 || .0 || 2.1
|-
| style="text-align:left;"|
| style="text-align:left;"|Detroit
| 3 || 0 || 9.0 || .100 || .143 ||  || 2.0 || .3 || 1.0 || .3 || 1.0
|- class="sortbottom"
| style="text-align:center;" colspan="2"|Career
| 23 || 0 || 7.0 || .300 || .314 || .500 || 1.5 || .3 || .2 || .0 || 1.9

Personal life
Sirvydis is the son of Virginijus Sirvydis, a former professional basketball player who played in many European countries, winning the North European Basketball League championship in 2001 with Russian club Ural Great Perm. In 2012, Virginijus began his coaching career as an assistant for LKL club Sakalai Vilnius.

References

2000 births
Living people
Basketball players from Vilnius
BC Rytas players
Dallas Mavericks draft picks
Detroit Pistons players
Fort Wayne Mad Ants players
Lithuanian men's basketball players
Motor City Cruise players
National Basketball Association players from Lithuania
Shooting guards
Small forwards